Gonzalo Barrios can refer to:

 Gonzalo Barrios (politician) (1902–1993), Venezuelan politician
 Gonzalo Barrios (video game player) (born 1995), professional Super Smash Bros. player